Everything I Love is a solo piano album by American jazz pianist Kenny Drew recorded in 1973 and released on the SteepleChase label.

Reception
The Allmusic review awarded the album 4½ stars, stating: "This is easily one of the best albums of Kenny Drew's career."

Track listing
All compositions by Kenny Drew except as indicated
 "Sunset" - 3:45   
 "Portrait of Mariann" - 4:30   
 "Blues for Nils" - 3:25   
 "Yesterdays" (Otto Harbach, Jerome Kern) - 5:55   
 "Ev'rything I Love" (Cole Porter) - 3:23   
 "Flamingo" - 2:39 Bonus track on CD    
 "Fingering" - 1:48 Bonus track on CD    
 "Winter Flower" (Thomas Clausen) - 4:32   
 "Fall" - 5:43   
 "I Can't Get Started" (Vernon Duke, Ira Gershwin) - 4:47   
 "Don't Explain" (Billie Holiday, Arthur Herzog Jr.) - 5:07
Recorded on October 1 (tracks 6, 7 & 10), November 13 (tracks 1, 4 & 9), November 14 (tracks 2 & 11) and December 31 (tracks 3, 5 & 8), 1973 in Copenhagen, Denmark

Personnel
Kenny Drew - piano

References

1974 albums
Kenny Drew albums
Solo piano jazz albums
SteepleChase Records albums